Yuri Nascimento de Araujo, known as Yuri (born 13 April 1996), is a Brazilian football player who plays for Portuguese club Académico de Viseu.

Club career
He made his professional debut in the Segunda Liga for Académico de Viseu on 30 August 2015 in a game against Oriental.

References

External links

1996 births
Footballers from São Paulo
Living people
Brazilian footballers
Brazilian expatriate footballers
Académico de Viseu F.C. players
F.C. Penafiel players
Liga Portugal 2 players
Association football forwards
Brazilian expatriate sportspeople in Portugal
Expatriate footballers in Portugal